Godonela aestimaria, the tamarisk peacock, is a moth of the family Geometridae. It is found in southern and south-eastern Europe and the Middle East.

The wingspan is 21–25 mm. There are two generations per year with adults on wing from April to May and again from August to October.

The larvae feed on various species of Tamarix.

Subspecies
 Godonela aestimaria sareptanaria (Staudinger, 1871)
 Godonela aestimaria kuldshana (Wehrli, 1940)

References

External links
 
 Chiasmia aestimaria on Lepiforum.de

Macariini
Moths described in 1809
Moths of Europe
Moths of Asia
Taxa named by Jacob Hübner